Valemount station is on the Canadian National Railway mainline in Valemount, British Columbia. The station is served by Via Rail's The Canadian as a flag stop (48 hours advance notice required). As of November 2019, Via Rail stated that passengers with valid tickets departing this stop could wait inside the nearby Valemount Hotel, as the station has no on-site shelter. However, as of 2022 this is no longer advertised and may not be available.

References

External links 
Via Rail Station Description

Via Rail stations in British Columbia
Railway stations in Canada opened in 1927